Blausee (literally: Blue Lake) is a lake in Bernese Oberland, Kandergrund, Switzerland. It is located near the Kander river.

Gallery

External links
Blausee.ch  tourist information

Bernese Oberland
Blau
Lakes of the canton of Bern